The Orvieto Funicular is a funicular railway in the Italian city of Orvieto. The line passes through the rampart, which surrounds the city centre, in a tunnel.

The line was originally built in 1888, and took the form of water-ballast counterbalanced funicular. This line was in use until 1970, when it was abandoned. Twenty years later, in 1990, a new electrically hauled funicular was built on the route of the old.

The cars of the new line are unmanned, and the whole line is controlled by a single controller in the upper station. The line operates every 15 minutes, or more frequently if traffic demands it. It has the following parameters:

At the upper station, the funicular connects with two routes operated by electric minibuses that serve the city centre.

See also 
 List of funicular railways

References

External links 
 Official site
 

Funicular railways in Italy
Orvieto
Railway lines in Umbria
1445 mm gauge railways
Former water-powered funicular railways converted to electricity
Buildings and structures in Orvieto